Kamajai is a small town in Rokiškis district municipality, Lithuania. It is situated on the banks of the Šetekšna River, some 14 km to south of Rokiškis. According to the 2011 census, it had 577 residents. The town has a small hospital, library, and hosts annual "Kuc kuc Kamajuos" festival.

The Kamajai manor is known from 1541. The town slowly grew around it. The first wooden church was built in 1635 and a couple decade later Kamajai is referred to as a town. Around 1745 the town was reconstructed according to Classicism ideas. The town has a rectangular plan and in the crossing of four main streets there is the main square, used to be known for its horse trades. The oldest part of the town, especially the street network, is protected by the government as a monument of urbanism.

In 1774 a parish school was opened. During the 1863 Uprising, the town was seized by the rebels led by Antanas Mackevičius. In 1905, during the revolution in Russia, locals as the social democratic leader Jurgis Smolskis created Republic of Kamajai and resisted the tsarist authorities. The new Kamajai church, named after Saint Casimir, was built in 1903 in Gothic Revival style. It has two towers. It is said that one of the towers collapsed during World War II, and the other was severely damaged. The residents, lacking funds for reconstruction, decided to tear down the second tower. To this day the towers are not rebuilt.

Kamajai is known as the residence of poet and priest Antanas Strazdas. He died in the town and was buried in the cemetery, but the exact location is unknown. The cemetery has a memorial cross right in the center. A monument for Strazdas was built in 1933, the 100th anniversary of his death, in the main square of the town. The school is also named after the poet.

Jewish life

Jews began to settle in Kamai in the seventeenth century. According to the all-Russian census of 1897, the population had risen to 1,105, of whom 944 were Jewish (85%).
During the 1905 revolution,  Jurgis Smolskis, in coordination with other communities, helped to prevent a pogrom fomented by the tsarist authorities.
Between the two world wars, a Hebrew school and cultural and political associations were active in the city. About 60 Jewish families lived in the city before the start of the Second World War. With the annexation of Lithuania to the Soviet Union in 1940, non-communist Jewish cultural activities were banned as for other Lithuanian citizens.

On June 26, 1941, during Operation Barbarossa, the city was occupied by the Germans. Even before the entrance of the Wehrmacht, pro-Nazi Lithuanians organized a pogrom against the Jews. After the occupation, the Jews of the city were gathered in a small neighborhood ghetto. A few weeks later, the men were deported to Rokiskis and the women and children to the Obeliai area, where they were murdered in late August 1941 along with the rest of other Jewish citizens of the region.

References

 
  

Towns in Lithuania
Towns in Panevėžys County
Novoalexandrovsky Uyezd
Rokiškis District Municipality